The 1972 Winter Universiade, the VII Winter Universiade, took place in Lake Placid, New York, United States.

References

https://books.google.com/books/about/Lake_Placid_Universiade.html?id=lTRGygAACAAJ

1972
U
U
U
Winter multi-sport events in the United States
International sports competitions in New York (state)
February 1972 sports events in the United States
March 1972 sports events in the United States
Sports in Lake Placid, New York
1972 in sports in New York (state)